Tenali Engineering College is located near Tenali, Andhra Pradesh, India, offering Bachelor of Engineering (B.E.) courses affiliated to world-renowned and recognized   Jawaharlal Nehru Technological University, Kakinada and approved by All India Council for Technical Education  AICTE. It is located at Anumarlapudi village, approx 8 km from Tenali, 20 km from Guntur City and 20 km from Mangalagiri.

History
The college was established in 2007 by Jampala Gopala Rao Education Society (JGRES).

References

External links
Tenali Engineering College Website

Colleges in Guntur
Engineering colleges in Andhra Pradesh
Educational institutions established in 2007
2007 establishments in Andhra Pradesh